The 1981 FIBA Club World Cup was the 15th edition of the FIBA Intercontinental Cup for men's basketball clubs. It was the first edition of the competition that was held under the name of FIBA Club World Cup. It took place at São Paulo, Brazil.

Participants

Sources
1981 edition

Group stage

Group A 

Day 1, June 26 1981

|}

Day 2, June 27 1981

|}

Day 3, June 28 1981

|}

Day 4, June 29 1981

|}

Day 5, June 30 1981

|}

Group B 

Day 1, June 26 1981

|}

Day 2, June 27 1981

|}

Day 3, June 28 1981

|}

Day 4, June 29 1981

|}

Day 5, June 30 1981

|}

Places 7–10 

Note: The individual scores in the League stage are accumulated.

Day 1, July 2 1981

|}

Day 2, July 3 1981

|}

Places 1–6 

Note: The individual scores in the League stage are accumulated.

Day 1, July 2 1981

|}

Day 2, July 3 1981

|}

Day 3, July 4 1981

|}

3rd place game 
July 5 1981

|}

Final 
July 5 1981

|}

Final standings

External links
 1981 World Cup for Champion Clubs

1981
1981 in Brazilian sport
International basketball competitions hosted by Brazil
1981–82 in South American basketball
1981–82 in American college basketball
1981–82 in European basketball
1981 in African basketball
1981 in Australian basketball
1981 in Asian basketball